Parabrotula tanseimaru is a species of ray-finned fish within the family Parabrotulidae, that is found off southern Japan in the Sagami Bay. It is a bathypelagic species, swimming at depths up to 1300 meters below sea level. It feeds on copepods and grows to around 4.9 centimers in length, with the largest specimen being 6.2 centimeters in length. The species is only known from a single type locality collected off Sagami Bay, with 25 other specimens being caught in trawl nets up to 680 meters deep.

The species has been classified as 'Data deficient' by the IUCN Red List, as its current population is unknown, and no conversation efforts have been made towards it.

References 

Fish described in 1991
Parabrotulidae
IUCN Red List data deficient species
Fish of Japan